The 8th annual Canadian Screen Awards were originally scheduled to be held on March 29, 2020, to honour achievements in Canadian film, television, and digital media production in 2019. As in prior years, the awards in many of the technical and craft categories would have been presented in a series of advance Canadian Screen Week galas in the week before the main ceremony.

Nominations were announced by the Academy of Canadian Cinema and Television on February 18.

On March 12, 2020 it was announced that the ceremony had been cancelled due to the COVID-19 pandemic in Canada. The academy stated that the winners would still be announced in some form, but did not immediately announce any concrete details; on March 28, the academy affirmed that it would not be announcing the winners that weekend as originally planned, but reaffirmed that it would announce and celebrate the winners "properly when the time is right".

In early May, the academy indicated that the winners would be announced in a series of livestreams during the week of May 25 to May 28. The first livestream, on May 25, presented the awards in news, sports, and documentary categories. Children's, youth, lifestyle, and reality programming were presented on May 26, scripted television programming was presented on May 27, and films were presented on May 28. Both CBC Television and CTV assisted the academy in the production of the livestreams.

Hosts
Hosts of livestream segments included Lloyd Robertson, Herbie Kuhn, Maitreyi Ramakrishnan, Emma Hunter, Evany Rosen, Kayla Lorette, Eric McCormack, and Théodore Pellerin.

Special awards
The first recipients of the academy's special awards were announced on December 4, 2019.

Lifetime Achievement Award: Ian Stempels
Margaret Collier Award: Ian Stempels
Radius Award: Dan Levy
Earle Grey Award: Tina Keeper
Academy Icon Award: Alex Trebek
Gordon Sinclair Award: Anton Koschany
Board of Directors Tribute: Michael Donovan, Robin Mirsky
Humanitarian Award: Nathalie Younglai
Industry Leadership Award: Crave
Outstanding Media Innovation Award: Secret Location

Film

Television

Programs

Acting

News and information

Sports

Craft awards

Directing

Music

Writing

Digital media

References

07
2019 awards in Canada
2019 film awards
2019 television awards
2020 in Canadian cinema
2020 in Canadian television
2020 in Ontario
Events postponed due to the COVID-19 pandemic
Impact of the COVID-19 pandemic on cinema
Impact of the COVID-19 pandemic on television
Cancelled film events
Cancelled television events